Johanna Chao Kreilick is the president of the Union of Concerned Scientists, a scientific advocacy nonprofit based in the United States. 
She has represented the organization in lobbying Congress and business leaders to address climate change.

Kreilick previously led major international initiatives with the Open Society Foundations, the Hauser Center for Nonprofit Organizations at Harvard University, and the Unitarian Universalist Service Committee.  She is noted for her work on racial justice and for engaging both scientists and advocates in effective decision making.

Early life and education
Kreilick studied anthropology at Stanford University, receiving her B.A. with distinction. She was named the 2005 Lucius N. Littauer Fellow at the Harvard Kennedy School of Government, where she earned an M.P.A.

Career
Kreilick established a grant-making program for economic justice at the Unitarian Universalist Service Committee (UUSC), working with partners in 62 countries around the world. Those she supported include Asian and Pacific Islander immigrant communities and workers worldwide.

Kreilick established the Justice and Human Rights Program at the Hauser Center for Nonprofit Organizations at Harvard University, focusing on international criminal justice and prison reform.

In 2013 Kreilick joined the Open Society Foundations. As an executive officer she was responsible for its Strategy Unit including the planning, research and the assessment of over fifty programs globally.  She also founded a major Climate Action Initiative at the Foundations.

Kreilick became President of the Union of Concerned Scientists (UCS) in May 2021.

She also serves on a number of advisory boards for organizations including the Environmental Voter Project, the BlueGreen Alliance and TSNE MissionWorks.

References

Living people
Stanford University alumni
Harvard Kennedy School alumni
Year of birth missing (living people)